Lina Jacques-Sébastien (born 10 April 1985 in Créteil,  France) is a French sprint athlete who specializes in the 100 metres and 200 metres.

Biography
She finished sixth in the 100 metres at the 2004 World Junior Championships, and also won a bronze medal in the 4 × 100 metres relay. She won the silver medal in the 100 metres at the 2005 European U23 Championships, and in the 200 metres at the 2005 Mediterranean Games. She competed at the 2005 European Indoor Championships and the 2009 European Indoor Championships without reaching the final.

In the 4 × 100 metres relay she finished fourth at the 2005 World Championships. She also competed at the 2008 Olympic Games together with Muriel Hurtis-Houairi, Myriam Soumaré and Carima Louami, but in their first round heat they did not finish and were eliminated due to a mistake with the baton exchange. Jacques-Sebastien later won a silver medal at the 2009 Jeux de la Francophonie.

Her personal best times are 7.35 seconds in the 60 metres (indoor), achieved in February 2008 in Bordeaux; 11.30 seconds in the 100 metres, achieved in June 2008 in Sotteville-lès-Rouen; and 22.59 seconds in the 200 metres, achieved at the 2010 European Championships in Barcelona.

Achievements

References

External links
Interesting referencement articles about Lina JS

1985 births
Living people
Sportspeople from Créteil
French people of Martiniquais descent
French female sprinters
Athletes (track and field) at the 2008 Summer Olympics
Athletes (track and field) at the 2012 Summer Olympics
Olympic athletes of France
European Athletics Championships medalists
Mediterranean Games silver medalists for France
Athletes (track and field) at the 2005 Mediterranean Games
Mediterranean Games medalists in athletics
Olympic female sprinters